The Harmonia Ensemble is an Italian chamber music group started in 1991 under the direction of Giampiero Bigazzi. Beginning as a trio (Orio Odori, clarinet; Damiano Puliti, cello; Alessandra Garosi, keyboards) they have worked with many other musicians in their career.  Their repertoire is eclectic, covering music of modern composers, popular, jazz, ethnic styles, and original compositions.  Their concerts and albums have featured music by Nino Rota, Gavin Bryars, Frank Zappa, Roger Eno, and the Beatles, among others.

Their recordings include:

 Nino Rota 1992
 In a Room (music of Roger Eno) 1993 
 Harmonia meets Zappa (with Roger Eno) 1994
 Events Line 1996
 The North Shore (music of Gavin Bryars) 1999
 Fellini: L’Uomo dei Sogni 2001 
 Gypsies 2001
 Ulixes (with Kočani Orkestar) 2001
 Yellow Penguin 2016

Italian musical groups
Musical groups established in 1991
Chamber music groups
1991 establishments in Italy